Tiger Army is an American psychobilly band based in Los Angeles, California. The group was formed in 1996 in Berkeley, California, and its only constant member is singer, guitarist, and lead songwriter Nick 13. The band has released six studio albums and four EPs.

History 
Tiger Army played their first show at the famous 924 Gilman Street venue in Berkeley, California, on March 29, 1996. The band's sound drew from early punk, rock n' roll and rockabilly, as well as dark English pop. Their first official release was a self-titled vinyl record EP, now referred to as the Temptation EP. The record was released by Chapter 11 Records. This EP caught the attention of Tim Armstrong of Rancid; he was also co-owner of Hellcat Records. Armstrong signed the band.

Tiger Army recorded their first full-length, the self-titled Tiger Army, in January 1999. It was released that October. Stand-up bassist Joel Day left Tiger Army before the band was signed, so the Quakes stand-up bassist Rob Peltier was hired to play on the album. Drummer Adam Carson of AFI, who had been helping out the band live, played on the record, as well. The band then embarked on a California mini-tour promoting the album in 1999. In 2000, Nick 13 asked former AFI bassist Geoff Kresge, one of his former bandmates from Influence 13, to join Tiger Army. Ex-Samhain drummer London May came on board as well.

Tiger Army II: Power of Moonlite followed in 2001. Fred Hell replaced London May shortly after the recording. The band toured with TSOL, The Damned, Dropkick Murphys and others in support of the record and went to Europe and Japan for the first time on the album as well. The band's friend and drum tech, Mike Fasano, played on the next Tiger Army album, Tiger Army III: Ghost Tigers Rise, when Hell was unable to record or tour behind the album. Nick 13 announced a new lineup for Tiger Army, featuring drummer James Meza and stand-up bassist, Jeff Roffredo, formerly of Los Angeles psychobilly bands Cosmic Voodoo, Calavera, and The Rezurex in 2004. This lineup supported Social Distortion on an extensive US tour.

In the spring of 2005, the band headlined a string of five sold-out shows at the Hollywood House Of Blues. The following year, the band sold out four nights at the Anaheim House of Blues. They also hit the road with Morrissey and AFI, performing several headlining tours around the world.

Tiger Army made major festival appearances across the US and Europe in support of their fourth album, titled Music from Regions Beyond. The album was released on June 5, 2007 and was produced by Jerry Finn. "Forever Fades Away" went to No. 1 on Los Angeles rock station KROQ FM, which Tiger Army performed on Jimmy Kimmel Live! and at radio festivals like "BFD". The New York Times called the album "one of the year's best punk albums".

Geoff Kresge returned to Tiger Army in early 2008 and joined Nick 13 and drummer James Meza on tours of the U.S., Canada, Australia, Japan and Europe. The band launched a multi-night festival, Octoberflame, in Southern California in 2008, concluding two years of touring behind Music from Regions Beyond. Nick launched a solo project focused on Americana/country music in 2009, making his first live solo appearance at the Stagecoach Festival in 2010 in Indio, California. Tiger Army continued to appear at Octoberflame each year, as well as in cities like Las Vegas, San Diego, Tempe, Costa Mesa and the MusInk Festival. On June 7, 2011, Nick 13 released his solo album on Sugar Hill Records. Tiger Army has been less active while 13 has built his solo career in the Americana world.

Tiger Army played their largest standalone headlining show to date at the Orange County Fair in 2011. In March/April 2012, the band performed two shows in Southern California and one in Las Vegas dubbed "Spring Forward." Octoberflame V followed with six shows in five cities. In December 2012, Tiger Army announced "Spring Forward 2013," which took place in March 2013 in San Diego, Ventura, CA and Las Vegas. The band played a radio show in Arizona around the same time.

Octoberflame VI took place in October 25 and 26, 2013 at City National Grove of Anaheim. The two back-to-back shows were advertised as Tiger Army's last shows of 2013. The Octoberflame events have become known for varied set lists that explore deep cuts and cover songs, special guests and diverse support acts running the gamut of rock, alt-rock, punk, hardcore, psychobilly, industrial, rockabilly and more.

In February 2014, Geoff Kresge announced he would be leaving Tiger Army via a lengthy statement on his Facebook page.

In June 2014, Nick 13 announced that writing for a new Tiger Army album was underway via the band's Facebook page. After announcing that live performances including the annual Octoberflame dates would be on hold for 2014 to focus on preparing for the album, the return of Octoberflame (VII) for 2015 was announced in June, with tickets sold out by early July. Beginning with the 2015 Octoberflame shows, which showcased material from the Ghost Tigers Rise album, drummer Mike Fasano rejoined the band on a full-time basis. Tiger Army released their fifth studio album, V •••–, on May 20, 2016, on Luna Tone Records/Rise Records.

On June 22, 2018, the band released a three-song EP, Dark Paradise, which featured covers of Lana Del Rey's "Dark Paradise" and the Chantays' instrumental "Pipeline."

Tiger Army's sixth full-length studio album, Retrofuture, was released on September 13, 2019, on Luna Tone Records/Rise Records. The following month, the band played two sold-out shows at the Wiltern in Los Angeles for Octoberflame X; supporting acts included Brian Fallon (formerly of the Gaslight Anthem), the Delta Bombers, Wayne Hancock, and 8 Kalacas.

Band members 
Current
 Nick 13 – guitars, lead vocals (1996–present)
 Djordje Stijepovic – upright bass, backing vocals (2015–present)
 Mike Fasano – drums, percussion (2004, Tiger Army III: Ghost Tigers Rise, and 2015-present)
Former
 Geoff Kresge – upright bass, backing vocals (2000–2004, 2008–2014)
 Joel Day – upright bass (1996–1997)
 Adam Carson – drums, percussion (1996–1999, one show in 2008, two songs in 2012)
 London May – drums, percussion (2000–2001)
 James Meza – drums, percussion (2004–2014)
 Fred Hell – drums, percussion (2002–2004)
 Jeff Roffredo – upright bass (2004–2008)
Touring
 Joe Fish – drums (1999)
 Rob Peltier – upright bass (1999, Tiger Army)

Timeline

Discography

Studio albums 
 1999: Tiger Army
 2001: Tiger Army II: Power of Moonlite
 2004: Tiger Army III: Ghost Tigers Rise – No. 146 US
 2007: Music from Regions Beyond – No. 49 US
 2016: V •••– – No. 75 US
 2019: Retrofuture

EPs 
 1997: Temptation EP
 2002: Early Years EP
 2004: Ghost Tigers EP
 2018: Dark Paradise EP

Compilations 
 1997: Punk Fiction Wedge Records "F.T.W"
 1999: Give 'Em the Boot II HellCat "Nocturnal"
 2002: Give 'Em the Boot III HellCat "Power of Moonlite"
 2003: Punk-O-Rama Vol. 8 Epitaph Records "Incorporeal"
 2004: Give 'Em the Boot IV HellCat "Atomic"
 2004: Punk-O-Rama Vol. 9 Epitaph Records "Temptation"
 2005: Punk-O-Rama Vol. 10 Epitaph Records "Ghostfire/Rose of the Devil's Garden video"
 2005: Give 'Em the Boot DVD HellCat "Never Die"
 2006: Give 'Em the Boot V HellCat "Swift Silent Deadly"
 2007: 2007 Warped Tour Compilation Side One Dummy "Afterworld"
 2007: Give 'Em the Boot VI HellCat "Afterworld"
 2008: Nightmare Revisited "Oogie Boogie's Song"

References

External links 

Musical groups established in 1996
Punk rock groups from California
Hellcat Records artists
Musical groups from Berkeley, California
Horror punk groups
American psychobilly musical groups
Country musicians from California